Whetstone is a rural locality in the Goondiwindi Region, Queensland, Australia. In the  Whetstone had a population of 65 people.

History 
Whetstone was opened for selection on 17 April 1877;  were available.

Whetstone Provisional School opened on 19 July 1904 and became Whetstone State School on 1 January 1909. In 1910 it was renamed Inglewood West State School. It suffered from low student numbers and consequently closed and re-opened a number of times, closing finally in 1928.

Whetstone Provisional School opened  9 July 1917. In 1926 it became Whetstone State School. It closed on 4 June 1958.

In the  Whetstone had a population of 65 people.

References 

Goondiwindi Region
Localities in Queensland